Shwe Sin Aung (born 9 April 1990) is a Burmese footballer who plays as a forward. She has been a member of the Myanmar women's national team.

International career
Shwe Sin Aung represented Myanmar at the 2007 AFC U-19 Women's Championship. She capped at senior level during the 2014 AFC Women's Asian Cup qualification.

References

1990 births
Living people
Women's association football forwards
Burmese women's footballers
People from Ayeyarwady Region
Myanmar women's international footballers